The Gambia has sent a team to every Commonwealth Games from 1970 except the boycotted 1986 Games. The only medal for the Gambia was won in their first appearance in 1970, a bronze by Sheikh Tidiane Faye in the men's high jump.

The Gambia withdrew from the Commonwealth in October 2013, so it was not represented at the 2014 Commonwealth Games in Glasgow, Scotland.

The Gambia returned to the Commonwealth on 8 February 2018, as Adama Barrow had promised to do as part of his campaign in 2016 in which he was elected as the third President of the Gambia.

A team from The Gambia competed at the 2018 Commonwealth Games, having been restored to its membership of the Commonwealth Games Federation on 31 March 2018.

Medals

References

The Gambia and the Commonwealth of Nations
Nations at the Commonwealth Games